The Tenth World Trade Organization Ministerial Conference was held in Nairobi, Kenya from 15 to 19 December 2015. The conference was chaired by the Kenyan Foreign Affairs Minister Amina Mohamed.

Afghanistan and Liberia acceded to the WTO, bringing the total membership of the organization to 164, with the total number of least-developed countries who have joined since 1995 rising to nine.

References

World Trade Organization ministerial conferences
December 2015 events in Africa
2015 in Kenya
2010s in Nairobi
Diplomatic conferences in Kenya